The Skenderija Bridge (also called Ajfel or Ajfelov most) is a footbridge located in Sarajevo, Bosnia and Herzegovina opposite the Skenderija Centre which crosses the River Miljacka. It was designed by Gustave Eiffel. The bridge is home to a small number of love locks, a phenomenon practiced by lovers on various European, Asian and Australian bridges.

External links

Bridges in Sarajevo
Gustave Eiffel's designs